The 2013 Stanford Cardinal football team represented Stanford University in the 2013 NCAA Division I FBS football season. The Cardinal were led by third-year head coach David Shaw. They played their home games at Stanford Stadium and were members of the North Division of the Pac-12 Conference.

The Cardinal won the Pac-12 North division for the second straight year, advancing to the Pac-12 Football Championship Game, where they defeated the Arizona State Sun Devils 38–14. With the win, the Cardinal won the Pac-12 Championship for the second straight year and represented the conference in the 100th Rose Bowl Game against the Michigan State Spartans of the Big Ten Conference on New Year's Day, January 1, 2014, where they were defeated by the Spartans 24–20.

Previous season

The Cardinal won the conference title after defeating UCLA in the Pac-12 Football Championship Game and represented the Pac-12 in the Rose Bowl, where they defeated Wisconsin 20–14 to win their first Rose Bowl game since 1972. It was Stanford's third consecutive year in a BCS bowl game. The Cardinal finished the season 12–2 (8–1 in the Pac-12).

Roster

Coaching staff

David Shaw– Head Coach (Bradford M. Freeman Director of Football)
Derek Mason– Defensive Coordinator (Willie Shaw Director of Defense)
Mike Bloomgren– Offensive Coordinator/Offensive Line (Andrew Luck Director of Offense)
Pete alamar – Special Teams Coordinator
Lance Anderson – Outside Linebackers/Admissions Liaison
Mike Sanford Jr. – Quarterbacks/Wide Receivers/Recruiting Coordinator
Randy Hart – Defensive Line
Dave Kotulski – Inside Linebackers
Tavita Pritchard – Running Backs
Morgan Turner –Tight Ends
 Jarrett huk – Defensive Assistant
Vavae tata – Defensive Assistant
Derek Belch – Graduate Assistant
Greg mangan – Defensive Graduate Assistant
Marc mattioli – Defensive Graduate Assistant
Joseph ashfield – Offensive Assistant
Tsuyoshi kawata – Offensive Assistant
Timot lamarre – Offensive Assistant
Ron lynn – Director of Player Development
Shannon turley – Kissick Family Director of Football Sports Performance
Steve bartlinski – Head Football Athletic Trainer

Schedule

Game summaries

San Jose State

at Army

No. 23 Arizona State

at Washington State

No. 15 Washington

at Utah

1st quarter scoring: STAN – T. Gaffney 1-yard run (J. Williamson kick); UTAH – Karl Williams 4-yard pass from Travis Wilson (Andy Phillips kick); STAN – T. Montgomery 100-yard kickoff return (Williamson kick);
UTAH – Dres Anderson 51-yard pass from Wilson (Phillips kick)

2nd quarter scoring: UTAH – Anderson 3-yard run (Phillips kick)

3rd quarter scoring: UTAH – Phillips 23-yard field goal

4th quarter scoring: UTAH – Phillips 48-yard field goal; STAN – D. Cajuste 7-yard pass from K. Hogan (Williamson kick)

No. 9 UCLA

1st quarter scoring: STAN – Conrad Ukropina 31-yard field goal

2nd quarter scoring: No scoring

3rd quarter scoring: UCLA – Ka'imi Fairbairn 38-yard field goal; STAN – Kodi Whitfield 30-yard pass from Kevin Hogan (Ukropina kick); STAN – Tyler Gaffney 1-yard run (Ukropina kick)

4th quarter scoring: UCLA – Shaquelle Evans 3-yard pass from Brett Hundley (Fairbairn kick); STAN – Gaffney 4-yard run (Ukropina kick)

at Oregon State

No. 2 Oregon

Stanford leads the series with Oregon 45–30–1 (.599). The series started in 1900 at Stanford, Stanford 34, Oregon 0; the last meeting was the 2012 game at Oregon, Stanford 17, Oregon 14 (OT).

1st quarter scoring: STAN – Tyler Gaffney 2-yard run (Jordan Williamson kick)

2nd quarter scoring: STAN – Kevin Hogan 11-yard run (Williamson kick); STAN – Williamson 19-yard field goal

3rd quarter scoring: STAN – Williamson 34-yard field goal; STAN – Williamson 26-yard field goal

4th quarter scoring: STAN – Williamson 30-yard field goal; ORE – Daryle Hawkins 23-yard pass from Marcus Mariota (Matt Wogan kick); ORE – Rodney Hardrick 65-yard blocked field goal return (Two-point conversion failed); ORE – Pharaoh Brown 12-yard pass from Mariota (Wogan kick)

at USC

1st quarter scoring: USC – Soma Vainuku 1-yard pass from Cody Kessler (Andre Heidari kick failed); STAN – T. Gaffney 35-yard run (C. Ukropina kick); USC – Javorius Allen 1-yard run (Marqise Lee pass from Kessler)

2nd quarter scoring: USC – Heidari 23-yard field goal;  STAN – Ukropina 27-yard field goal

3rd quarter scoring: STAN – Gaffney 18-yard run (Ukropina kick)

4th quarter scoring: USC – Heidari 47-yard field goal

California (The Big Game)

In a 63–13 victory, #10 Stanford broke the record for most points scored in a Big Game and for the largest margin of victory.  With the victory, Stanford clinched the Pac-12 North Division Championship while Cal ended their season at 1–11, the most losses in one season in Cal football history.

1st quarter scoring: STAN – T. Montgomery 31-yard run (J. Williamson kick) CAL – Maurice Harris 15-yard pass from Goff, Jared (Vincen D’Amato kick); STAN – Montgomery 50-yard pass from K. Hogan (Williamson kick); STAN – Montgomery 12-yard pass from Hogan (Williamson kick); CAL – D’Amato 29-yard field goal

2nd quarter scoring: STAN – Montgomery 72-yard pass from Hogan (Williamson kick); STAN – M. Rector 45-yard pass from Hogan (Williamson kick); CAL – D’Amato 47-yard field goal; STAN – Montgomery 9-yard pass from Hogan (Williamson kick)

3rd quarter scoring: STAN – Gaffney,T 58-yard run (C. Ukropina kick)

4th quarter scoring: STAN – K. Young 27-yard run (Ukropina kick); STAN – F. Owusu 14-yard pass from E. Crower (Ukropina kick)

No. 25 Notre Dame

at No. 11 Arizona State (Pac-12 Championship Game)

1st quarter scoring: STAN – Tyler Gaffney 69-yard run (Jordan Williamson kick); ASU – D. J. Foster 51-yard run (Zane Gonzalez kick); STAN – Gaffney 1-yard run (Williamson kick)

2nd quarter scoring: STAN – Ty Montgomery 22-yard run (Williamson kick); STAN – Gaffney 1-yard run (Williamson kick); ASU – Foster 65-yard  pass from Taylor Kelly (Gonzalez kick)

3rd quarter scoring: STAN – Williamson 30-yard field goal

4th quarter scoring: STAN – Montgomery 24-yard pass from Kevin Hogan (Williamson kick)

vs. No. 4 Michigan State (Rose Bowl)

1st quarter scoring: STAN – Tyler Gaffney 16-yard run (Jordan Williamson kick); STAN – Williamson 34-yard field goal

2nd quarter scoring: MSU – Jeremy Langford 2-yard run (Michael Geiger kick); STAN – Kevin Anderson 40-yard interception return (Williamson kick); MSU – Trevon Pendleton 2-yard pass from Connor Cook (Geiger kick)

3rd quarter scoring: MSU – Geiger 31-yard field goal

4th quarter scoring: MSU – Tony Lippett 25-yard pass from Cook (Geiger kick); STAN – Williamson 39-yard field goal

Rankings

Statistics

Scores by quarter (all opponents)

Scores by quarter (Pac-12 opponents)

Awards and honors

All-American Selections

Offense
David Yankey, OL -- UNANIMOUS -- (AFCA, FWAA, TSN, WCFF, AP, USAT, CBS, ESPN, SI, Athlon, FOX)

Defense
Trent Murphy, LB -- CONSENSUS -- (AFCA, FWAA, TSN, WCFF, ESPN, SI, FOX)
Ed Reynolds, S (CBS, Athlon)

Special teams
Ty Montgomery, RS -- CONSENSUS -- (AFCA, TSN, WCFF, CBS, SI, USAT, Athlon, FOX)

All-Pac-12 Conference Team Selections

*Numbers in parentheses (2) indicate multiple All-Pac-12 Team Conference selections.

Notes
January 1, 2014 – OLB Kevin Anderson's interception return for a touchdown was his first in his career, first in the Rose Bowl game since 2002.

References

Stanford
Stanford Cardinal football seasons
Pac-12 Conference football champion seasons
Stanford Cardinal football